Gloria Ayanlaja-Obajimi (born 12 May 1956) is a Nigerian former sprinter. She competed in the women's 400 metres at the 1980 Summer Olympics.

References

External links
 

1956 births
Living people
Athletes (track and field) at the 1980 Summer Olympics
Nigerian female sprinters
Olympic athletes of Nigeria
Place of birth missing (living people)
Olympic female sprinters
20th-century Nigerian women